The bombing of Nuremberg was a series of air raids carried out by allied forces of the Royal Air Force (RAF) and the United States Army Air Forces (USAAF) that caused heavy damage throughout the city from 1940 through 1945.

Nuremberg was a favored point of attack for allied bombers in World War II even though it was only later included into the radius of action due to its location in the south of Germany. Because Nuremberg was a strong economic and infrastructural hub and had symbolic importance as the "City of the Nuremberg Rally" it was singled out by the Allies as an important target.

The greatest damages occurred from the attack on 2 January 1945 in which 521 British Bombers dropped 6,000 high-explosive bombs and one million incendiary devices on the city. 

The population suffered more than 1,800 deaths and 100,000 people lost their homes in this attack. Nuremberg's old town was almost completely destroyed, and the city as a whole was badly damaged. After Würzburg, Nuremberg was one of Bavaria's cities that suffered the most damage in the war, and was also among the most destroyed cities in Germany as a whole. The eastern half of the city (north of the Pegnitz river) was known as the "steppe" after the destruction and during the clearing of the rubble.

The air raids ceased on 11 April 1945. On 20 April, after the Battle of Nuremberg, the city was occupied by units of the 7th US Army.

Nuremberg as a military target 

Nuremberg was an important production location for armaments and the densely populated medieval old town was a well-suited destination for the purposes of the British Area bombing directive. Nuremberg, which during National Socialism was officially given the nickname "City of the Nuremberg Rally", was also a target for attacks with a considerable symbolic effect.

In relation to the total building mass, the inner city had a high proportion of half-timbered houses, i.e. buildings with a high proportion of wood that are highly combustible, and was therefore suitable for an effective attack using a combination of explosive and incendiary bombs. The purpose was to ignite a firestorm to increase the effect of the incendiary bombs. Daytime attacks on industrial and infrastructure targets were mostly carried out by the technically better equipped US Army Air Forces as part of the division of labor of the Allied air fleets in order to achieve a high degree of accuracy, which was technologically only possible to a limited extent. Nighttime area bombardments were mostly flown by the British RAF's  Pathfinder Force.

In the urban area, but not in the old town, which was most severely affected by the attack of 2 January 1945, there were numerous military targets: The factories of MAN in the south of the city built diesel engines for submarines and relevant components for Panther tanks. Other important companies were Siemens-Schuckert, TEKADE, Nüral (Nürnberger Aluminiumwerke, now Federal-Mogul), and Diehl. In addition the bombers targeted the Nuremberg motorcycle industry (Zündapp/Neumeyer, Hercules, Triumph, Victoria) and 120 other armament and companies that employed forced labor as well as the facilities of the German Reichsbahn: the marshaling yard in the south of the city and the main railway lines running over Nuremberg.

Timeline of the attacks 
Until 1942, there were only minor attacks. From 1942 to 1944 there was a fight for air supremacy over Germany which was won by the Allies in large parts. From autumn 1944, airfields of the Allies had moved close enough that it was possible to deploy low-flying aircraft. The following table is based on the information provided by G. W. Schramm.

Destruction 

Nuremberg's old town was largely destroyed. The southern parts of the city, St. Johannis and other neighborhoods were also hard hit. After Cologne, Dortmund and Kassel, Nuremberg had the largest amount of rubble per inhabitant among the major German cities. The population of Nuremberg had fallen to 195,000 by the end of the war, half of dwelling had been destroyed, the rest often damaged.

Reconstruction 
In 1947, ideas for reconstruction were collected in an urban planning competition. The "Kuratorium für den Wiederaufbau Nürnbergs" (Board of Trustees for the Reconstruction of Nuremberg) advised the city administration on questions of reconstruction. A simplified reconstruction was agreed upon.

It was at this time that the organisation 'The Old Town Friends Nuremberg (German: Altstadtfreunde Nürnberg e. V.) was set up to advocate a faithful, accurate reconstruction of the old town. The association supports the preservation and restoration of the existing historical old town houses and other architectural monuments in Nuremberg that are worth preserving.

By 1955 most of the reconstruction work had been completed or at least begun. From 1956 to 1960 the Nuremberg Town Hall (Wolffscher Bau, Rathaussaalbau) was rebuilt. Until 1957 the St. Sebaldus church was repaired. The largest restoration project was the city walls of Nuremberg with its 4 km long double wall and the moat.

The Katharinenkloster Nuremberg, today called Katherinenruine, which was completely destroyed during the air raids in 1945, was not rebuilt but secured as a ruin in 1970/71. Since then it has served as a memorial to the war and as a venue for events.

Bombs found after World War II 
Even after the end of the Second World War, unexploded bombs were (and still are) found in Nuremberg. They are often discovered by chance during construction work, and are rarely searched for in a targeted manner. The explosive ordnance clearance service (Kampfmittelräumdienst) is responsible for defusing and securing the aircraft bombs. Large-scale evacuations may be necessary during these operations.

See also 

 Nuremberg
 Battle of Nuremberg (1945)
 List of air operations during the Battle of Europe

Literature 

 
 
 
 Michael Diefenbacher, Rudolf Endres (Hrsg.): Stadtlexikon Nürnberg. 2., verbesserte Auflage. W. Tümmels Verlag, Nürnberg 2000,  (online). 
 Martin Middlebrook: Die Nacht, in der die Bomber starben. Der Angriff auf Nürnberg und seine Folgen für den Luftkrieg ("The Nuremberg raid"), Ullstein Verlag, Frankfurt am Main 1979, 
 Peter Schneider: 30./31. März 1944. Tod am Meisbach: Absturz der Lancaster ND441 bei Dotzlar. In: Wittgenstein. Blätter des Wittgensteiner Heimatvereins, 2007, pp. 130.

External links 

 
 Beschreibung des Angriffs 30./31. März 1944
 Danièle List: Der Luftkrieg in Nürnberg, in: historicum.net, retrieved 5 Januar 2013

City lexicon

References 

Nuremberg
20th century in Bavaria
History of Nuremberg
Pages with unreviewed translations